Madumetsa Jack Mogale  (born 1968/9), dubbed the West-End Serial Killer by police, is a South African serial killer who killed 16 people in 2008 and 2009. On 17 February 2011, Mogale was convicted on 52 of 61 charges related to 16 murders, 19 rapes, and 9 kidnappings.

Mogale committed his crimes near his residence in Westonaria and Lenasia, south of Johannesburg. Two women who survived being attacked by him testified at trial that he had claimed to be a Zion Christian Church (ZCC) preacher and a prophet.

See also
List of serial killers by country
List of serial killers by number of victims

References

1960s births
Living people
Male serial killers
South African serial killers
Year of birth uncertain